Fédération Libanaise de Cyclisme (Lebanese Cycling Federation or FELICYC) is the national governing body of cycle racing in Lebanon.

It is a member of the UCI and the Asian Cycling Confederation.

The Federation is the organiser of the 2019 Asian Mountain Bike Continental Championships.

References

External links

liban
Cycle racing organizations
Cycling
Cycle racing in Lebanon